Resurrection is a 1918 American silent drama film directed by Edward José and written by Leo Tolstoy and Charles E. Whittaker. The film stars Pauline Frederick, Robert Elliott, John St. Polis, and Jere Austin. The film was released on May 19, 1918, by Paramount Pictures. It is not known whether the film currently survives, so it may be a lost film.

Plot
As described in a film magazine, Katusha (Frederick), a servant, betrayed by Prince Nekludov (Elliott), a Russian officer and member of nobility, is forced through the inexorable Russian custom to become a woman of the streets. As a social outcast she is accused of the murder of prominent merchant and sentenced to Siberia by a jury on which the army officer is a member. Overcome by remorse he seeks the Czar and obtains a pardon for Katusha. Upon his arrival in Siberia he gives her the pardon and offers, in atonement for the wrong he has done her, to make her his wife. In the meantime, however, she has been taught right living by Simonson (St. Polis), a peasant, and is determined to stay with him until his sentence is complete.

Cast
Pauline Frederick as Katusha
Robert Elliott as Prince Nekludov
John St. Polis as Simonson 
Jere Austin as Shenbok

See also 
A Woman's Resurrection (1915)

References

External links 
 
 

1918 films
1910s English-language films
Silent American drama films
1918 drama films
Paramount Pictures films
Films directed by Edward José
Films based on Resurrection
American black-and-white films
American silent feature films
Films set in Russia
1910s American films